Very Subtle (foaled 1984 in Kentucky) was an American Thoroughbred racehorse who won three Grade I stakes including the 1987 Breeders' Cup Sprint against male opponents in which she defeated the heavily favored Groovy by four lengths.

Very Subtle was trained by Mel Stute and initially raced by the California-based partnership of Carl Grinstead and Ben Rochelle who had owned a number of other top runners including the 1986 American Champion Three-Year-Old Male Horse and Preakness Stakes winner Snow Chief who was also trained by Stute. Following the March 1987 passing of Carl Grinstead, the partnership horses were auctioned at an October sale at which Ben Rochelle bought Very Subtle for $1.2 million.

Subsequent to her Breeders' Cup win, Very Subtle raced for two more years before retiring to broodmare duty after her 1989 campaign.

Breeding record
Bred to Snow Chief as well as other notable sires such as Alydar and Caerleon, Very Subtle's most successful earner among her foals was the mare Dianehill, a winner of $426,551 sired by the outstanding Champion sire Danehill.

Pedigree

References

 Very Subtle's pedigree and partial racing stats

1984 racehorse births
Racehorses bred in Kentucky
Racehorses trained in the United States
Breeders' Cup Sprint winners
American Grade 1 Stakes winners
Thoroughbred family 18